The Adventures of Champion is an American children's Western series that aired from September 23, 1955, to March 3, 1956, for 26 episodes on CBS. In the United Kingdom, the series was re-broadcast under the title Champion the Wonder Horse. Unusually for a black and white show, the series was repeated on and off by the BBC in the UK throughout the 70s, 80s and early 90s, with its final BBC broadcast being the episode "The Stone Heart" on 23 January 1993.

Synopsis
Set in the 1880s in the American Southwest, 12-year-old Ricky North lives on a ranch with his uncle Sandy.  Ricky has an uncanny ability to find himself in some kind of trouble, but is always rescued by his faithful friend Champion, the Wonder Horse, a wild stallion who has befriended Ricky.  His adventures (and rescues) always involve Ricky's other constant companion, a German Shepherd named Rebel.

Cast 
Champion as Champion, the Wonder Horse

Barry Curtis as Ricky North

Jim Bannon as Sandy North

Blaze as Rebel, the dog

Background and production

Casting (animals) 
The horse starring in The Adventures of Champion was known as Television Champion, or TV Champ, for short.  In real life, the Wonder Horse, Champion, was owned by Gene Autry who, over many years, owned a succession of celebrity horses bearing the same name.  TV Champ was distinguished by his chestnut coat, blond mane and tail, four white stockings and broad white facial blaze.  He made frequent appearances with Autry in films and television during the 1950s.  Unlike his fictional namesake, TV Champ was a gelding.

Ken Beck and Jim Clark, in their book, The Encyclopedia of TV Pets: A Complete History of Television's Greatest Animal Stars, quote animal trainer Bob Blair as identifying the dog as J.R., the canine that had the title role in The Adventures of Rin Tin Tin TV program. "He was the best-trained dog in the business," Blair said.

Filming 
Filmed by Flying A Productions, the series was shot on location within California. Vasquez Rocks.  was used for the introduction and episodes. The Andy Jauregui Ranch at Placerita Canyon, Newhall    was also used for several exteriors.

Music 
 
Although uncredited, the title song was sung by Mike Stewart, and later recorded by Frankie Laine.  It was written by Marilyn Bergman and Norman Luboff.

"Champion the Wonder Horse! Champion the Wonder Horse!
Like a streak of lightnin' flashin' cross the sky,
Like the swiftest arrow whistlin' from a bow,
Like a mighty cannonball he seems to fly.
You'll hear about him everywhere you go.
The time'll come when everyone will know
(Up to episode 2, this line is "I wish there's not a man who doesn't know")
The name of Champion the Wonder Horse!"

The version recorded by Frankie Laine contains an additional verse, and repeats the chorus.  (According to YouTube, Laine had intended to record an album for children, but this was never completed.)  Laine's version was recorded on the Philips label, with Paul Weston and his Orchestra.

In 1991, the song was re-issued on Laine's album On the Trail Again.

Episodes

Release
 
In 2005, a set of six DVDs was released in the UK, by Pickwick Group Limited, under license from Encore Home Video.  The set is entitled The Adventures of Champion the Wonder Horse and sub-titled "the complete television series on 6 DVDs".

The set includes 23 of the original 26 episodes.  The missing episodes are "Mystery Mountain", "The Golden Hoax", and "Real Unfriendly Ghost". DVD 6 includes a bonus film entitled Horses and Guns, starring Gene Autry and one of his several horse-stars named Champion.

In August 2018, a 16mm film of "Real Unfriendly Ghost", dubbed in French, was discovered in the Archives of the University of Maryland by missing episodes hunter Ray Langstone.

Print media

During the years 1953 to 1960, comic annuals were published by World Distributors, Daily Mirror and Purnell. Second-hand copies of these may be obtained. 'Ricky North' became 'Ricky West' in these, as with the radio serial.

Champion also had his own comic book, Gene Autry's Champion, published by Dell Comics from 1951 to 1955, which continued as Gene Autry and Champion from 1955 to 1959.

Starting from the issue dated 4 June 1966, Champion the Wonder Horse ran as a comic strip in the UK comic book Buster. Minor characters in the strip included Sheriff Sean Kelly, Gentleman Tom, the bare-knuckle boxing champion, Dick Crabtree, the town's ambulance-chasing lawyer, and Nicky Brandwood, queen of the saloon.

Related shows
The television program used characters similar to those in the 1949–50 radio serial, The Adventures of Champion.  The radio serial told of young Ricky West (rather than Ricky North), who was raised on a ranch by his adoptive Uncle Smoky (rather than Sandy). Ricky was often accompanied by his German Shepherd, Rebel.

Beginning in 1950, The Gene Autry Show, a western/cowboy television series, aired for 91 episodes on CBS. The Adventures of Champion was a prime time spinoff for the 1955–1956 season.

References

External links
 
Video clip with theme tune
"The Chestnut" site 
"Broken Wheel Ranch" site – Champion page
"Gene Autry" site – Champion pages
Champion the Wonder Horse – comic annual gallery

1955 American television series debuts
1956 American television series endings
1950s American children's television series
Black-and-white American television shows
CBS original programming
English-language television shows
Television series about horses
1950s Western (genre) television series
Television series by CBS Studios